Peter Ruzicka (born 3 July 1948) is a German composer and conductor of classical music. He was director of the Hamburg State Opera, the Philharmonic Orchestra of Hamburg and the Salzburg Festival. Ruzicka was managing director and Intendant of the Salzburg Easter Festival and is professor at the Hochschule für Musik und Theater Hamburg. The list of his compositions includes numerous orchestral and chamber music works as well as the opera "Celan", about the poet Paul Celan, which was premiered in Dresden in 2001. His opera "Hölderlin" had its premiere at the Berlin State Opera in 2008. Ruzicka's third opera "Benjamin", about the philosopher Walter Benjamin, was written in 2015/16 for the Hamburg State Opera and premiered in 2018.

Biography
Ruzicka was born in Düsseldorf. He received his early musical training (piano, oboe and composition) at the Hamburg Conservatory. He studied composition with Hans Werner Henze and Hans Otte. He studied law and musicology in Munich, Hamburg and Berlin (interdisciplinary doctoral thesis: Die Problematik eines "ewigen Urheberpersönlichkeitsrechts", Berlin, 1977).

Ruzicka was artistic director of the Berlin Radio Symphony Orchestra from 1979 to 1987 and indendant of the Hamburg State Opera and the Philharmonic Orchestra of Hamburg from 1988 to 1997. Moreover, he was Artistic Advisor of the Royal Concertgebouw Orchestra in Amsterdam from 1997 to 1999. In 1999 he was named President of the Bavarian Theatre Academy. From 2001 to 2006, Ruzicka took over the Artistic Directorship of the Salzburg Festival. Ruzicka served as artistic director of the Munich Biennale between 1996 and 2014. He took over from Hans Werner Henze, and was succeeded by the dual directorship of Manos Tsangaris and Daniel Ott. Ruzicka was managing director and Intendant of the Salzburg Easter Festival from 2015 to 2020.

Ruzicka was appointed professor for cultural management at the Hochschule für Musik und Theater Hamburg in 1990. The composer is member of the Bavarian Academy of Fine Arts in Munich and of the Free Academy of Arts in Hamburg.

Ruzicka's works have been performed by leading international orchestras and ensembles like the Berlin Philharmonic Orchestra, the Vienna Philharmonic Orchestra, Symphony Orchestra of the Bavarian Radio Munich, German Symphony Orchestra Berlin, Bamberg Symphony Orchestra, Tonhalle Orchestra Zurich, Philharmonia Orchestra London, Orchestre de Paris, Czech Philharmony, Radio Symphony Orchestra Vienna, Israel Philharmonic Orchestra, Symphony Orchestra Montréal and the New York Philharmonic Orchestra. Conductors like Gerd Albrecht, Vladimir Ashkenazy, Semyon Bychkov, Riccardo Chailly, Christoph Eschenbach, Michael Gielen, Paavo Järvi, Mariss Jansons, Kurt Masur, Antonio Pappano, Giuseppe Sinopoli and Christian Thielemann have performed his works.

As a conductor Ruzicka has directed the German Symphony Orchestra in Berlin – recording CD productions of works by Mahler, Pettersson and Schreker – the Royal Concertgebouw Orchestra, the Sächsische Staatskapelle Dresden, the Gewandhausorchester Leipzig, the Bavarian Radio Symphony Orchestra, the NDR Symphony Orchestra Hamburg – recording a cycle of 12 orchestral works by Henze –, and the Munich Philharmonic amongst others. Ruzicka has also conducted three CDs of music by George Enescu for the cpo label.

Works
Ruzicka's works are published by Hans Sikorski.

Stage
 Celan, Musiktheater in sieben Entwürfen (1998–1999)
 Hölderlin, Eine Expedition (2007)
 Benjamin, Musiktheater in sieben Stationen (2015–2016)

Orchestra
 Metamorphosen über ein Klangfeld von Joseph Haydn for Large Orchestra (1990)
 "... das Gesegnete, das Verfluchte ...", 4 Orchestra Sketches (1991)
 Tallis (1993)
 Nachtstück (1997)
 "... Vorgefühle ..." (1998)
 Nachklang (1999)
 Memorial (2001)
 Affluence (2003)
 "... ins Offene ...", Music for 22 Strings (2005–2006)
 Vorecho, 8 Rudiments (2005)
 Maelstrom (2007)
 "...Zurücknehmen..." (2009)
 Mahler – Bild for orchestra (2010)
 "Trans" for chamber ensemble (2010)
 Clouds for orchestra and string quartet (2012/13)
 "Zwei Übermalungen (Über Unstern, R.W.") (2010–2012)

Concertante
 "...den Impuls zum Weitersprechen erst empfinge...", Music for Viola and Orchestra (1981)
 "...Inseln, randlos ..." for Violin, Chamber Chorus and Orchestra (1994–1995)
 Erinnerung for Clarinet and Orchestra (2001)
 ...Über die Grenze for Cello and Chamber Orchestra (2009)
 "Spiral" for horn quartet and orchestra (2013)

Chamber music
 ... über ein Verschwinden, String Quartet No.3 (1992)
 "... sich verlierend" for String Quartet and Narrator (1996)
 Tombeau for Flute (Alto Flute, Bass Flute) and String Quartet (2000)
 Sturz for String Quartet (2004)
 Nachschrift, 3 Pieces for Cello and Piano (2008)
 Erinnerung und Vergessen, String Quartet No.6 with Soprano (2008)

Vocal
 Acht Gesänge nach Fragmenten von Nietzsche (8 Songs after Fragments of Nietzsche) for Mezzo-Soprano (or Baritone) and Piano (1992)
 Die Sonne sinkt, 8 Songs after Fragments of Nietzsche for Baritone (or Mezzo-soprano) and Orchestra (1997–2000)
 Recherche (-im Innersten) for Chorus and Orchestra (1998)
 Celan Symphonie for Baritone, Mezzo-Soprano and Orchestra (2002)
 "... und möchtet Ihr an mich die Hände legen ...", 5 Fragments by Hölderlin for Baritone and Piano (2006–2007)

Piano
 Parergon, 7 Sketches to Hölderlin (2006)
 Five Scenes for Piano (2009)

Honors and awards
 1969: Prize of the city of Stuttgart
 1970: Composition Prize at the International Composition Competition "Bela Bartók", Budapest
 1971: UNESCO prize of the International Rostrum of Composers
 1972: Winner of the "International Gaudeamus Composition Competition", Hilversum
 1972: Bach Prize Fellowship of the Free and Hanseatic City of Hamburg
 1997: Honorary membership of the Hamburg State Opera
 2004: Louis Spohr Prize of the City of Braunschweig
 2005: Johannes Gutenberg Endowed Professorship at the University of Mainz
 2005: Honorary Membership Deutsches Symphonie-Orchester, Berlin
 2005: Honorary Membership German Music Council, a member of the International Music Council
 2006: Austrian Cross of Honour for Science and Art, 1st class
 2006: Golden Medal of Honour of Salzburg
 2006: Gold Coat of Arms Medal of the City of Salzburg
 2006: Silver Medal at the International Mozarteum Foundation
 2006: Prize "New Hearing" for successful placement of contemporary music, Munich
 2007: Chancellor Award of the International Salzburg Association
 2008: Honorary Doctorate of the Academy of Music and Theatre in Hamburg
 2008: Medal of the Free Academy of Arts in Hamburg

References

Sources

External links
 
 
 Interview with Peter Ruzicka on the music of George Enescu (in English und auf Deutsch, published 4 April 2022)

German classical composers
1948 births
Living people
Musicians from Düsseldorf
20th-century classical composers
21st-century classical composers
German male classical composers
20th-century conductors (music)
21st-century conductors (music)
Academy of Fine Arts, Munich
Recipients of the Austrian Cross of Honour for Science and Art, 1st class
International Rostrum of Composers prize-winners
Salzburg Festival directors
20th-century German composers
21st-century German composers
20th-century German male musicians
21st-century German male musicians